All Souls College Library, known until 2020 as the Codrington Library, is an academic library in the city of Oxford, England. It is the library of All Souls College, a graduate constituent college of the University of Oxford.

The library in its current form was endowed by Christopher Codrington (1668–1710), a fellow of the college who amassed his fortune through his sugar plantation in the West Indies which was worked by enslaved people of African descent. Codrington bequeathed books worth £6,000, in addition to £10,000 in currency (the equivalent of approximately £1.2 million in modern terms). The library, designed by Nicholas Hawksmoor, begun in 1716, was completed in 1751 and has been in continuous use by scholars since then. It is Grade I listed on the National Heritage List for England.

The modern collection comprises some 185,000 items, about a third of which were produced before 1800. The library's collections are particularly strong in Law, European History, Ecclesiastical History, Military History, and Classics. There is an expanding collection devoted to sociological topics and the History of Science. Unusually for an Oxford college library, access to the Codrington is open to all members of the university (subject to registration). The library contains a significant collection of manuscripts and early printed books, and attracts scholars from around the world.

The first woman to be admitted as a reader to the library was Cornelia Sorabji from Somerville College, at the invitation of Sir William Anson, 3rd Baronet in 1890.

In November 2020, the college took the decision to stop referring to the library as the Codrington Library, as part of a set of "steps to address the problematic nature of the Codrington legacy", which derives from exploitation of slave plantations.

References

External links 

 
 The Unseen University: The Codrington Library(short film) 

1751 establishments in England
All Souls College, Oxford
Oxford
Grade I listed library buildings
Infrastructure completed in 1751
Library buildings completed in the 18th century
Libraries of the University of Oxford
Nicholas Hawksmoor buildings
Slavery in the British West Indies
Codrington family
Name changes due to the George Floyd protests